is a Japanese wrestler. He competed in the men's Greco-Roman 130 kg at the 1988 Summer Olympics.

References

1966 births
Living people
Japanese male sport wrestlers
Olympic wrestlers of Japan
Wrestlers at the 1988 Summer Olympics
Place of birth missing (living people)
20th-century Japanese people